The Tromsø SkyRace is an international skyrunning competition held for the first time in 2014. It runs every year in Tromsø (Norway) in August and consists of four races both valid for the Skyrunner World Series.

Races
 Hamperokken Skyrace, a SkyMarathon across and up the Hamperokken ridge (57 km / 4800 m elevation)
 an official race of the Skyrunner World Series
 Tromsdalstind SkyRace, a SkyRace to the summit of Tromsdalstinden (28 km / 2000 m elevation)
 Blåmann Vertical, a Vertical Kilometer to the summit of Store Blåmann (2.7 km / 1044 m elevation)
 an official race of the Skyrunner World Series in 2014, 2015
 an official race of the Vertical Kilometer World Circuit since 2016
 Bønntuva tour-race, a mini SkyRace to the summit of Bønntuva and back (15 km / 800 m elevation)

Hamperokken Skyrace

Tromsdalstind Skyrace

Blåmann Vertical

Bønntuva Tour-Race

See also 
 Skyrunner World Series

References

External links 
 Official web site

Skyrunning competitions
Skyrunner World Series
Athletics competitions in Norway
Sport in Tromsø
Vertical kilometer running competitions